Big Town is a 1947 American crime film directed by William C. Thomas and written by Daniel Mainwaring and Maxwell Shane. The film stars Phillip Reed, Hillary Brooke, Robert Lowery, Veda Ann Borg, Byron Barr and Charles Arnt. The first in a series of four films based on the long-running radio program Big Town, it was released on May 23, 1947 by Paramount Pictures.

Plot

Cast  
Phillip Reed as Steve Wilson
Hillary Brooke as Lorelei Kilbourne
Robert Lowery as Pete Ryan
Veda Ann Borg as Vivian LeRoy
Byron Barr as Vance Crane
Charles Arnt as Amos Peabody
Nana Bryant as Mrs. Crane
Roy Gordon as Editor Post
Eddie Parks as Gerald Meeker
Nella Walker as Mrs. Johannsen
Thomas E. Jackson as Police Chief Berkley

Production
Pine Thomas bought film rights in 1945 intended to make two films a year in the series.

The script was written by Daniel Mainwaring who later recalled, "Bill Thomas of Pine and Thomas, who made very small and very bad pictures at Paramount, gave me my first real screenwriting job. I wrote six pictures in one year, all of which I'd just as soon forget except Big Town [1947]. At the end of the year, I fled to the hills and wrote Build My Gallows High."

Comic book adaptation
 Fiction House Movie Comics #1 (December 1946)

See also  
Big Town radio series

References

External links 
 
Review at Variety

1947 films
1947 crime drama films
American black-and-white films
American crime drama films
Films about journalists
Films adapted into comics
Films based on radio series
Films directed by William C. Thomas
Paramount Pictures films
1940s English-language films
1940s American films
Big Town